Celebrity Duets is the Arabic version of the American program  Celebrity Duets, where Arab’s most prominent professional singers team up with 13 non-singing celebrities from different backgrounds, in front of a live studio audience, a panel of judges, and viewers who get to vote them off, in a weekly elimination competition.
 
A panel of judges will give their opinion after each performance, although the final call on who remains in the running is the audience's, through SMS voting.
 
The prize money earned at the end of each episode will be donated to a charity selected by the leaving contestant.

Season 1
Lebanese actress Nadine Al Rassi reached the finale and won the grand prize, which she donated to the Lebanese Red Cross.
The second finalist of the show was Egyptian actor Amir Karrara who won the second prize in which he donated to the Children's Cancer Hospital 57357 in Egypt.

Contestants
Amir Karrara - Actor
Christina Sawaya - Miss Lebanon 2001
Georges Assaf - Sports trainer
Jenny Esper - Actress
Mohamad Dagher - Fashion designer
Nadine Al Rassi - Actress
Chef Ramzi - Cook
Youmna Cherry - Presenter

Duet Partners
Ahmed Al Shereef
Aline Lahoud
Amr Youssef
Carole Samaha
Fady Andrawos
Fares Karam
Georges El Rassi
Hossam Habeeb
Joseph Attieh
Melhem Zein
Miral Faisal
Mohammad Bash
Myriam Fares
Nabil Shouail
Rayan Eid
Rouweida El Mahroug
Samira Saeid
Shereen Abdel Wahab
Sofia El Marikh
Wadih El Safi
Yara Sbini

Judges
Joumana Haddad
Oussama Rahbani
Romeo Lahoud

Season 2
Lebanese actress Maguy Bou Ghosn and Lebanese actor Carlos Azar battled in the finale episode for the grand prize. Maguy Bou Ghosn won and donated her prize to St. Jude Children Cancer Center.

Contestants
Maguy Bou Ghosn - Actress
Carlos Azar - Actor
Tarek Abou Jaoude - Music Composer
Omar al-Dini - Comedian
Seif el-Dine el-Sbei - Actor and Director
Pamela el-Kik - Actress 
Hiba al-Abassiri - Journalist 
Habib el-Habib - Actor 
Mirna Khayat - Director 
Dima al-Jundi - Actress 
Mayssoun al-Rouwaily - Actress

Duet Partners
Abdallah Bel Kheir 
Arwa
Assi el-Helani
Carole Samaha
Fady Andarous
Ghadi
Gilbert Simon
Haifa Wehbe
Issam Karika
Joseph Attieh
Kazem el-Saher
Marwan Khoury
Melhem Zein
Mohammad Iskandar
Mouein Shreif
Myrian Fraes
Nabil Cheil 
Oumaima Taleb
Rouwaida Attieh
Saad Ramadan
Saber el-Roubai
Samira Said
Sara Farah 
Sherine Abdel Wahab
Sofia Marikh
Wadih el-Safi
Zeina Aftimos

Judges
Abdallah Bel Kheir
Oussama Rahbani 
Romeo Lahoud

Season 3
Lebanese actor and TV presenter Tony Abu Jawdeh won and donated his prize to Les Petits Souliers.

Contestants
Tony Abu Jawdeh - Actor and TV presenter
Adel Hakki - Actor
Mario Bassil - Comedian
Carine Rizcallah - Actress
Jessy Abdo - Actress
Maged El Masry - Actor
Carolina de Oliveira - Actress and TV presenter
Richard Khoury - Chef
Samar Yousry - TV presenter
Ziad Al-Samad - Football player
Ward al-Khal - Actress
Merna al-Mohandes - Actress

Judges
Hasan El-Raddad
Oussama Rahbani
Romeo Lahoud

Season 4
Lebanese actor Tony Issa won and donated his prize to Kids First Association.

Contestants
 Loreen Kodeih - Actress
 Sana Naser - TV presenter
 Joy Karam - Singer
 Roula Chamieh - Actress
 Shoukran Mortaja - Actress
 Cynthia Khalifa - Actress and TV presenter
 Antoine Al-Hajj - Chef
 Moez Toumi - Actor
 Tony Issa - Actor
 Michel Azzi - TV presenter
 Wessam Saleeba - Singer and actor
 Bassem Yakhour - Actor
 Eduard - Actor and singer

Judges
Oussama Rahbani
Tarek Abou Jaoude
Mona Abou Hamze

Season 5
Lebanese actress Dalida Khalil won and donated her prize to North Autism Center.

Contestants
Dalida Khalil - Actress
Jerry Ghazal - Actor
Oweiss Mkhallalati - Actor
Misbah Ahdab - Politician
Sandra Rizk - Actress
Fady Charbel - Comedian
Arza Shadyak - TV presenter
Talal Jurdi - Actor
Pierre Chammassian - Comedian
Randa Sarkis - TV presenter
Douja Hijazi - Actress
Raja Nasser Eldine - TV presenter
Sacha Dahdouh - Actress and TV presenter

Judges
Simon Asmar
Oussama Rahbani
Mona Abou Hamze

Season 6
Lebanese singer Alwalid Hallani won and donated his prize to fight PID.

Contestants
Valerie Abou Chacra - Actress and Miss Lebanon 2015
Abbas Jaafar - Actor
Aline Broummana - TV Presenter
Alwalid Hallani - Singer
Dolly Ayash - Actress and TV presenter
Layla Abdel Latif - Astrologer
Liliane Nemri - Actress
Melhem Riachy - Author
Nady Abou Chabke - Comedian
Saad Hamdan - Actor
Sara Abi Kanaan - Actress
Tony Baroud - TV presenter
Vera Yammine - Politician

Judges
Simon Asmar
Oussama Rahbani
Mona Abou Hamze

Versions

References

External links
Official site
Official LBC Fan Club site

Non-American television series based on American television series
Celebrity reality television series
Lebanese television series
2010 television series debuts
Lebanese Broadcasting Corporation International original programming